Kfar Shamai is a moshav in northern Israel.

History
The moshav was founded in 1949 by immigrants to Israel from Yemen, built over the Palestinian village of al-Sammu'i that was depopulated during the 1948 war. Most of these immigrants have stayed, as of 2006, and over the years immigrants from Romania and Morocco joined them. Today, the moshav houses a museum for the preservation of local history, since its establishment. 

The name "Kfar Shamai" is based on Shammai the Elder, who was the partner of Hillel the Elder.  According to Jewish tradition, Shammai was buried in Har Meron or in "Shammai Hill" near the community.

References

Moshavim
Populated places in Northern District (Israel)
Yemeni-Jewish culture in Israel
Populated places established in 1949
1949 establishments in Israel
Moroccan-Jewish culture in Israel
Romanian-Jewish culture in Israel